Michael Mayer (born 17 October 1970) is a retired German football player. He played for one season in the Bundesliga with VfB Stuttgart.

Honours
 Bundesliga champion: 1991–92

References

External links
 

1970 births
Living people
German footballers
VfB Stuttgart players
VfB Stuttgart II players
SSV Reutlingen 05 players
Bundesliga players
Association football midfielders
People from Reutlingen
Sportspeople from Tübingen (region)
Footballers from Baden-Württemberg